The 1991 U.S. Pro Indoor was a men's tennis tournament played on indoor carpet courts that was part of the Championship Series of the 1991 ATP Tour. It was the 24th edition of the tournament and was played at the Spectrum in Philadelphia, Pennsylvania in the United States from February 11 to February 18, 1991. First-seeded Ivan Lendl won the singles title, his second at the event after 1986.

Finals

Singles

 Ivan Lendl defeated  Pete Sampras 5–7, 6–4, 6–4, 3–6, 6–3 
 It was Lendl's 1st title of the year and the 95th of his career.

Doubles

 Rick Leach /  Jim Pugh defeated  Udo Riglewski /  Michael Stich 6–4, 6–4 
 It was Leach's 1st title of the year and the 19th of his career. It was Pugh's 1st title of the year and the 20th of his career.

References

External links
 ITF tournament edition details

U.S. Pro Indoor
U.S. Pro Indoor
Ebel U.S. Pro Indoor
Ebel U.S. Pro Indoor
Ebel U.S. Pro Indoor